Daqing station is a railway and metro station located in South District, Taichung, Taiwan. It is served by the Taiwan Railways Administration and Taichung Metro. The metro station opened on December 19, 2020.

Overview
The station began as a TRA at-grade local station. The TRA station was elevated on October 28, 2018, as part of the modernization process on the Taichung Line. The metro portion of the station is also elevated, and the two are connected by a bridge.

The station is primarily serviced by Local Trains (區間車). A few times per day a Chu-Kuang Express (莒光號) or a Tzu-Chiang Limited Express (自強號) stops at the station.

Station layout

Around the station
 Chungshan Medical University
 Fengle Sculpture Park
 Taichung Municipal Taichung Industrial High School
 Taichung Mosque

See also
 List of railway stations in Taiwan

References

1998 establishments in Taiwan
Railway stations in Taichung
Railway stations opened in 1998
Railway stations served by Taiwan Railways Administration
Taichung Metro